Jessica Ramos (born June 27, 1985) is an American politician from the state of New York. Ramos is a member of the Democratic Party. Since 2019, she has served in the New York State Senate representing District 13, which currently includes the Queens neighborhoods of Corona, Elmhurst, East Elmhurst, and Jackson Heights.

Early life and education 
Ramos was born at Elmhurst Hospital and raised in Queens, the daughter of Colombian immigrants. Exposed to civic life at an early age, Ramos participated in community activities with the Colombian immigrant community's local civic groups and later on as a Democratic district leader and community board member. She graduated from the Academy of American Studies and attended Hofstra University before dropping out to work in the office of Hiram Monserrate.

Career 
Prior to entering the State Senate, Ramos worked in City Hall where she was initially a communications adviser and ultimately became director of Latino media from April 2016 to December 2017. In this role, Ramos was the city's top Latina spokeswoman and liaison to the Spanish-language press. Before joining city government, Ramos was the communications director for Build Up NYC, an advocacy organization for construction, building, and maintenance workers. She has also done communications work with a local chapter of the American Federation of State, County and Municipal Employees and a regional branch of the Service Employees International Union.

Ramos has served on Queens Community Board 3, and she was a Queens County Democratic district leader from 2010 to 2014.

New York Senate 
In January 2018, Ramos announced her candidacy for New York State Senate, challenging Jose Peralta, a former member of the Independent Democratic Conference, in the Democratic Party primary election. Ramos defeated Peralta and won the general election. She received a number of high-profile endorsements, including from New York City Mayor Bill de Blasio, the New York Times, and Kirsten Gillibrand.

In the Senate, Ramos is serving as the chair on the Committee on Labor.

Personal life 
Ramos was born in Elmhurst to an undocumented seamstress and a printing pressman. She was the first member of her immediate family to be born in America. Ramos currently lives in Jackson Heights with her two sons.

In 2019, Senator Ramos became housing co-tenants or roommates with fellow New York State Senator Alessandra Biaggi and Assemblywoman Yuh-Line Niou while living in Albany, New York.

References

External links

1985 births
21st-century American politicians
21st-century American women politicians
American politicians of Colombian descent
Hispanic and Latino American women in politics
Hofstra University alumni
Living people
Democratic Party New York (state) state senators
People from Astoria, Queens
People from Corona, Queens
People from Elmhurst, Queens
Politicians from New York City
Women state legislators in New York (state)